Skryahivka (Ukrainian: Скрягівка) is a railway station near Bilka, Sumy Oblast, Ukraine. The station is on the Sumy Directorate of Southern Railways on the Boromlya-Kyrykivka line.

Notes

 Tariff Guide No. 4. Book 1 (as of 05/15/2021) (Russian) Archived 05/15/2021.

References

External links

Skryahivka on railwayz.info
Passenger train schedule
Suburban train schedule

Railway stations in Sumy Oblast
Sumy
Buildings and structures in Sumy Oblast